Johanne Christine Svendsen (born 15 May 2004) is a Danish tennis player.

Svendsen has a career-high singles ranking by the Women's Tennis Association (WTA) of 1096, achieved on 23 August 2021. She has won two singles titles on the ITF Circuit. On the junior tour, she has a career-high combined ranking of 14, achieved on 3 January 2022.

Svendsen competes for Denmark in the Billie Jean King Cup, where she has a win-loss record of 3–4.

Junior career
Grand Slam results - Singles:
 Australian Open: 1R (2022)
 French Open: 3R (2022)
 Wimbledon: 2R (2022)
 US Open: 2R (2022)

Grand Slam results - Doubles:
 Australian Open: SF (2022)
 French Open: QF (2022)
 Wimbledon: 2R (2022)
 US Open: 1R (2021, 2022)

ITF Circuit finals

Singles: 2 (2 titles)

Singles: 2 (1 title, 1 runner-up)

References

External links
 
 
 

2004 births
Living people
Danish female tennis players